Cambronne is an elevated station on line 6 of the Paris Métro. Located in the 15th arrondissement. It is named after the nearby Place Cambronne and rue Cambronne, which was in turn named after Viscount Pierre Cambronne (1770–1842), a general at the Battle of Waterloo. The station is at the location of the Barrière de l'École-Militaire, a gate built for the collection of taxes as part of the Wall of the Farmers-General; the gate was built between 1784 and 1788 and was demolished before 1859.

History
The station opened as part of the former line 2 South on 24 April 1906 when it was extended from Passy to Place d'Italie. On 14 October 1907, line 2 South was incorporated into line 5. It was then temporarily absorbed by line 6 from 17 May to 6 December 1931. It was permanently absorbed by line 6 on 6 October 1942.

During the summer of 2014, the canopies above the tracks were renovated and as part of the "Renouveau du métro" programme by the RATP, the station was renovated on 30 June 2015.

In 2019, the station was used by 2,524,418 passengers, making it the 207th busiest of the Métro network out of 302 stations.

In 2020, the station was used by 1,567,953 passengers amidst the COVID-19 pandemic, making it the 167th busiest of the Métro network out of 304 stations.

In 2021, the station was used by 1,636,566 passengers, making it the 218th busiest of the Métro network out of 304 stations.

Passenger services

Access 
The station has 2 access on either side of Boulevard Garibaldi:

 Access 1: Boulevard Garibaldi Côté des numéros impairs (odd numbered)
 Access 2: Boulevard Garibaldi Côté des numéros pairs (even numbered)

Station layout

Platforms 
The station is elevated and has a standard configuration with 2 tracks surrounded by 2 side platforms.

Other connections 
The station is also served by line 80 of the RATP bus network, and at night, by lines N12 and N61 of the Noctilien network.

Gallery

References

Paris Métro stations in the 15th arrondissement of Paris
Railway stations in France opened in 1906
Paris Métro line 6